Green North Regional Force (FRNV) was a Chilean regionalist political party active only in the Coquimbo Region. It was legally constituted by the Electoral Service of Chile between 2015 and 2017.

History
It was founded on October 26, 2015 (as recorded in the public deed issued on 22 December 2015 in the Official Journal of the Republic of Chile to establish its constitution) by various split personalities of the New Majority disenchanted with the government of Michelle Bachelet. The founders of the party made the decision after Bachelet replace the Intendant of the Region of Coquimbo Hanne Utreras (current vice president of the party) by Claudio Ibáñez. The creation of the party had the support of prominent political figures in the region, as the deputy Sergio Gahona (UDI).

In its statement, Green North Regional Force claims to be a regionalist and progressive party, whose primary focus is the human being and its rights. Their registration was initially rejected on 4 July 2016 by failing to reach the minimum of signatures required, however on July 13 the errors were corrected and the party was finally registered legally by the Electoral Service in the Region of Coquimbo.

The party will participate in the municipal elections of 2016, in which the party would provide support for the candidates for mayor in Combarbalá (Gustavo Hernandez), La Serena (Hanne Utreras), Punitaqui (Pedro Valdivia) and Río Hurtado (Edgar Ángel). It also will submit lists of candidates for councilors in all municipalities of the Region of Coquimbo.

Despite being active only in the Region of Coquimbo, the party aims to expand to other regions in the future. It has also announced that it will present candidates in parliamentary elections and regional councilors to be held in 2017.

In January 2017, the party agreed to merge with the Regional and Popular Front, the Social Agrarian Regionalist Independent Movement, and We Are Aysén to form the Social Green Regionalist Federation (Federación Regionalista Verde Social, FREVS). It was officially dissolved on April 25, 2017, when the constitution of the FREVS was legalized.

References

External links
 Official site (in Spanish)

Political parties in Chile
Political parties established in 2015
Political parties disestablished in 2017
2015 establishments in Chile
2017 disestablishments in Chile
Regionalist parties